Wuxi Suning Plaza 1 is a supertall skyscraper in Wuxi, Jiangsu, China. Construction began in 2010 and ended in 2014. It functions as a hotel, apartment, and office building.

See also
List of tallest buildings in China

References

Office buildings completed in 2014
Skyscrapers in Wuxi
2014 establishments in China
Skyscraper office buildings in China
Residential skyscrapers in China
Skyscraper hotels in China